Brooker may refer to:

 Brooker, Florida, a US town
 Brooker, South Australia, a locality in the District Council of Tumby Bay
 Brooker Highway, a Tasmanian Highway
 Hundred of Brooker, a cadastral unit in South Australia
 Brooker (surname)